El Train or L Train may refer to:
An Elevated railway
L (New York City Subway service)
L Taraval, streetcar route in San Francisco 
The Chicago "L", a rapid transit system
The Market–Frankford Line in Philadelphia, commonly called "the El"
L Line (Los Angeles Metro), a light rail line in Los Angeles County, California

See also
 L Line (disambiguation)